Visit to Oz is an EP by the San Diego, California punk rock band Unwritten Law, released in June 1999 by Interscope Records and Rapido Records. It was released only in Australia to coincide with the band's first headlining tour there and is currently out of print. It contains two songs from the band's 1998 album Unwritten Law and two demo tracks recorded in 1993, "Kill to Breathe" which would appear in its final form one year later on their 1994 debut Blue Room. The song "Driven", which had previously only appeared on the band's 1992 demo tape, is not available on any other release.

Track listing
Cailin - 3:59
Lonesome (remix) - 3:24
Driven (1993 Demo) - 4:06
Kill to Breathe (1993 Demo) - 4:44

Personnel
Scott Russo - vocals
Steve Morris - lead guitar
Rob Brewer - rhythm guitar
Micah Albao - bass (tracks 1–2)
John Bell - bass (track 3–4)
Wade Youman - drums

References

External links
Visit to Oz Ep @ discord.com

Unwritten Law EPs
1999 EPs